Lepidochrysops hawkeri is a butterfly in the family Lycaenidae. It is found in south-eastern Angola.

Adults have been recorded in October.

References

Butterflies described in 1929
Lepidochrysops
Endemic fauna of Angola
Butterflies of Africa